Alexander Sirotkin (August 6, 1890 – January 17, 1965) was a Soviet lieutenant general and division commander. He fought for the Imperial Russian Army in World War I. He received the Cross of St. George, the Order of St. Vladimir, the Order of St. Anna and the Order of Saint Stanislaus (Russian). After the October Revolution in November 1917, he went over to the Bolsheviks and fought for them in the subsequent civil war. He was awarded the Order of Lenin, the Order of the Red Banner, the Order of the Red Star and for his participation in the Great Patriotic War, the Order of Suvorov.

1890 births
1965 deaths
Russian military personnel of World War I
Soviet military personnel of the Russian Civil War
Soviet military personnel of World War II
Soviet lieutenant generals
Recipients of the Cross of St. George
Recipients of the Order of St. Vladimir, 4th class
Recipients of the Order of St. Anna, 2nd class
Recipients of the Order of St. Anna, 3rd class
Recipients of the Order of St. Anna, 4th class
Recipients of the Order of Saint Stanislaus (Russian), 2nd class
Recipients of the Order of Saint Stanislaus (Russian), 3rd class
Recipients of the Order of Lenin
Recipients of the Order of the Red Banner
Recipients of the Order of Suvorov, 2nd class
Frunze Military Academy alumni